Sugging is a market research industry term, meaning "selling under the guise of research".  This behavior occurs when a product marketer falsely pretends to be a market researcher conducting a survey, when in reality they are simply trying to sell the product in question. 

Generally considered unethical, this tactic is prohibited or strongly disapproved of by trade groups, such as the UK Market Research Society MRS, CASRO and MRA, for their member research companies.

See also
Frugging
Push poll

References
Elliott, Stuart, "You've Got Mail, Indeed", The New York Times, October 25, 1999
Elliott, Stuart, "A New Survey Seeks to Gauge the Research Needs of American Companies as They Look Abroad, The New York Times, January 5, 1996  
Glossary of Terms at Association for Qualitative Research (UK)
"Comment on Email Authentication: Summitt Issues", filed by CASRO with Federal Trade Commission
"Comment of Proposed Rule: CAN-SPAM Act Rulemaking", filed by CASRO with Federal Trade Commission
"Sales Under the Guise of Research (Sugging)", Marketing Research Association (US)
 XploreMR
 

Ethically disputed business practices
Market research